Mary Frances Isom Cottage ("Spindrift") is a house in Neahkahnie Beach, Oregon, in the United States, included on the National Register of Historic Places. The cottage was designed by American architect A. E. Doyle for the head librarian of the Library Association of Portland, Mary Frances Isom.

See also
 National Register of Historic Places listings in Tillamook County, Oregon

References

External links
 Images at Oregon Digital, University of Oregon Libraries

1912 establishments in Oregon
A. E. Doyle buildings
Arts and Crafts architecture in Oregon
Houses completed in 1912
National Register of Historic Places in Tillamook County, Oregon